A Ramachandran: A Retrospective (2004), is a two-volume book by Indian art historian R. Siva Kumar. It is a study of the life and works of artist A. Ramachandran. It has more than 500 reproductions and a selection of rare, historical photographs. Selected writings by the artist, biographical notes and chronology of works are also included in the book.

According to the publisher, the book "may well be considered a model in writing about an artist and his work, and will be of immense value to coming generations of art scholars and connoisseurs." It is the most comprehensive book on A. Ramachandran's art.

See also
 A. Ramachandran
 R. Siva Kumar
 Rabindra Chitravali
 The Last Harvest : Paintings of Rabindranath Tagore (2011 book)

References

Indian paintings
Books by R. Siva Kumar
Indian biographies
Books about visual art
2004 non-fiction books
2004 in art
Art history books
Case studies
Works about art genres
Works about ideologies
21st-century Indian books